Peter C. Economus (born June 10, 1943) is an inactive Senior United States district judge of the United States District Court for the Northern District of Ohio.

Education and career

Economus was born in Youngstown, Ohio. He received a Bachelor of Arts degree from Youngstown State University in 1967, and received a Juris Doctor from the University of Akron School of Law in 1970. He was a staff attorney at the Mahoning County Legal Assistance Association, Ohio from 1971 to 1972. He was in private practice in Youngstown from 1972 to 1982. He was a judge of the Mahoning County Ohio Court of Common Pleas from 1982 to 1995.

Federal judicial service

Economus was nominated to the United States District Court for the Northern District of Ohio by President Bill Clinton on February 28, 1995, to a seat vacated by Frank J. Battisti. He was confirmed by the United States Senate on June 30, 1995, and received his commission the same day. He assumed senior status on July 3, 2009. He was succeeded by Benita Y. Pearson.

References

Sources

1943 births
Living people
Ohio state court judges
Judges of the United States District Court for the Northern District of Ohio
United States district court judges appointed by Bill Clinton
Youngstown State University alumni
University of Akron alumni
Lawyers from Youngstown, Ohio
20th-century American judges
21st-century American judges